In enzymology, a cyanoalanine nitrilase is an enzyme that catalyzes the chemical reaction

3-cyano-L-alanine + 2 H2O  L-aspartate + NH3

Thus, the two substrates of this enzyme are 3-cyano-L-alanine and H2O, whereas its two products are L-aspartate and NH3.

This enzyme belongs to the family of hydrolases, those acting on carbon-nitrogen bonds other than peptide bonds, specifically in nitriles.  The systematic name of this enzyme class is 3-cyano-L-alanine aminohydrolase. This enzyme is also called beta-cyanoalanine nitrilase.  This enzyme participates in cyanoamino acid metabolism.

References

 

EC 3.5.5
Enzymes of unknown structure